Countess Elizabeth Báthory de Ecsed (7 August 1560 – 21 August 1614) was a Hungarian noblewoman and alleged serial killer from the family of Báthory, who owned land in the Kingdom of Hungary (now Slovakia).

Báthory and four of her servants were accused of torturing and killing hundreds of girls and women between 1590 and 1610. Her servants were put on trial and convicted, whereas Báthory was confined to her home. She was imprisoned within Castle of Csejte.

The charges leveled against Báthory have been described by several historians as a witch-hunt. Other writers, such as Michael Farin in 1989 have said that the accusations against Báthory were supported by testimony from more than 300 individuals, some of whom described physical evidence and the presence of mutilated dead, dying and imprisoned girls found at the time of her arrest. In a 2018 article for Przegląd Nauk Historycznych (Historical Science Review) Aleksandra Bartosiewicz stated that when Báthory was persecuted, the accusations were a spectacle to destroy her family's influence in the region, which was considered a threat to the political interests of her neighbors, including the Habsburg empire.

Stories about Báthory quickly became part of national folklore. Legends describing her vampiric tendencies, such as the tale that she bathed in the blood of virgins to retain her youth, were generally recorded years after her death and are considered unreliable. Some insist she inspired Bram Stoker's Dracula (1897), although Stoker's notes on the novel provided no direct evidence to support this hypothesis. Nicknames and literary epithets attributed to her include The Blood Countess and Countess Dracula.

Early life and education

Báthory was born in 1560 on a family estate in Nyírbátor, Royal Hungary. She spent her childhood at Ecsed Castle. Her father was Baron George VI Báthory of the Ecsed branch of the family, brother of Andrew Bonaventura Báthory, who had been voivode of Transylvania. Her mother was Baroness Anna Báthory (1539–1570), daughter of Stephen Báthory of Somlyó, also voivode of Transylvania, who was of the Somlyó branch. Through her mother, Elizabeth was the niece of the Hungarian noble Stephen Báthory (1533–1586), the King of Poland, the Grand Duke of Lithuania of the Polish–Lithuanian Commonwealth, and Prince of Transylvania. She had several siblings. Her older brother, Stephen Báthory (1555–1605), served as a Judge Royal of Hungary.

As a child, Báthory had multiple seizures that may have been caused by epilepsy. At the time, symptoms relating to epilepsy were diagnosed as falling sickness and treatments included rubbing blood of a non-sufferer on the lips of an epileptic or giving the epileptic a mix of a non-sufferer's blood and piece of skull as their episode ended.

A proposal made by some sources in order to explain Báthory's cruelty later in her life is that she was trained by her family to be cruel.

Báthory was raised a Calvinist Protestant. As a young woman, she learned Latin, German, Hungarian and Greek. Born into a privileged family of nobility, Báthory was endowed with wealth, education and a prominent social rank.

At the age of 13, before her first marriage, Báthory allegedly gave birth to a child. The child, said to have been fathered by a peasant boy, was supposedly given away to a local woman who was trusted by the Báthory family. The woman was paid for her actions, and the child was taken to Wallachia. Evidence of this pregnancy came up long after Elizabeth's death, through rumors spread by peasants; therefore, the validity of the rumor is often disputed.

Biography

In 1573, Báthory was engaged to Count Ferenc Nádasdy, a member of the Nadasdy family. It was a political arrangement within the circles of the aristocracy. Nádasdy was the son of Baron Tamás Nádasdy de Nádasd et Fogarasföld and Orsolya Kanizsai.

On 8 May 1575, Báthory and Nádasdy were married at the palace of Vranov nad Topľou (Varannó in Hungarian). The marriage resulted in combined land ownership in both Transylvania and the Kingdom of Hungary.

Nádasdy's wedding gift to Báthory was his household, Castle of Csejte, situated in the Little Carpathians near Vág-Ujhely and Trencsén (present-day Nové Mesto nad Váhom and Trenčín, Slovakia). The castle had been bought by his mother in 1569 and given to Nádasdy, who transferred it to Elizabeth during their nuptials, together with the Csejte country house and seventeen adjacent villages.

After the wedding, the couple lived in Nadasdy's castle at Sárvár.

In 1578, three years into their marriage, Nádasdy became the chief commander of Hungarian troops, leading them to war against the Ottomans. Báthory managed business affairs and the family's multiple estates during the war. This role usually included responsibility for the Hungarian and Slovak people, providing medical care during the Long War (1593–1606), and Báthory was charged with the defense of her husband's estates, which lay on the route to Vienna. The threat of attack was significant, for the village of Csejte had previously been plundered by the Ottomans while Sárvár, located near the border that divided Royal Hungary and Ottoman-occupied Hungary, was in even greater danger. There were several instances where Báthory intervened on behalf of destitute women, including a woman whose husband was captured by the Ottomans and a woman whose daughter was raped and impregnated.

Báthory's daughter, Anna Nádasdy, was born in 1585 and was later to become the wife of Nikola VI Zrinski. Báthory's other known children include Orsolya (Orsika) Nádasdy (1590 – unknown) who would later become the wife of István II Benyó; Katalin (Kata or Katherina) Nádasdy (1594 – unknown); András Nádasdy (1596–1603); and Pál (Paul) Nádasdy (1598–1650), father of Franz III Nádasdy, who was one of the leaders of the Magnate conspiracy against Holy Roman Emperor Leopold I. Some chronicles also indicate that the couple had another son, named Miklós Nádasdy, although this cannot be confirmed, and it could be that he was simply a cousin or died young, as he is not named in Báthory's will from 1610. György Nádasdy is also supposedly the name of one of the deceased Nádasdy infants, but this cannot be confirmed. All of Elizabeth's children were cared for by governesses, as Báthory herself had been.

Ferenc Nádasdy died on 4 January 1604 at the age of 48. Although the exact nature of the illness which led to his death is unknown, it seems to have started in 1601, and initially caused debilitating pain in his legs. From that time, he never fully recovered, and in 1603 became permanently disabled. He had been married to Báthory for 29 years. Before dying, Nádasdy entrusted his heirs and widow to György Thurzó, who would eventually lead the investigation into Báthory's crimes.

Accusations

Investigation

Between 1602 and 1604, after rumors of Báthory's atrocities had spread throughout the kingdom, Lutheran minister István Magyari made complaints against her, both publicly and at the court in Vienna. In 1610, Matthias II assigned György Thurzó, the Palatine of Hungary, to investigate. Thurzó ordered two notaries, András Keresztúry and Mózes Cziráky, to collect evidence in March 1610. By October 1610 they had collected 52 witness statements; by 1611, that number had risen to over 300.

Báthory is said to have begun killing daughters of the lesser gentry, who were sent to her gynaeceum by their parents to learn courtly etiquette. The use of needles was also mentioned by the collaborators in court. There were many suspected forms of torture carried out by Báthory.

Some witnesses named relatives who died while at the gynaeceum. Others reported having seen traces of torture on dead bodies, some of which were buried in graveyards, and others in unmarked locations.

Arrest
On 13 December 1612, Nikola VI Zrinski confirmed the agreement with Thurzó about the imprisonment of Báthory and distribution of the estate. On 31 December, Thurzó went to Csejte Castle and arrested Báthory along with four of her servants, who were accused of being her accomplices: Dorotya Semtész, Ilona Jó, Katarína Benická and János Újváry ("Ibis" or Fickó). According to Thurzó's letter to his wife, his unannounced visit found one dead girl and another living "prey" girl in the castle, but there is no evidence that they asked her what had happened to her. Although it is commonly believed that Báthory was caught in the act of torture, she was having dinner. Initially, Thurzó made the declaration to Báthory's guests and villagers that he had caught her red-handed. However, she was arrested and detained prior to the discovery or presentation of the victims. It seems most likely that the claim of Thurzó's discovering Báthory covered in blood has been the embellishment of fictionalized accounts.

Thurzó debated further proceedings with Báthory's son Paul and two of her sons-in-law, Nikola VI Zrinski and György Drugeth. Her family, which ruled Transylvania, sought to avoid the loss of Báthory's property which was at risk of being seized by the crown following a public scandal. Thurzó, along with Paul and her two sons-in-law, originally planned for Báthory to be sent to a nunnery, but as accounts of her actions spread, they decided to keep her under strict house arrest.

Most of the witnesses testified that they had heard the accusations from others, but did not see it themselves. The servants confessed under torture, which is not credible in contemporary proceedings. They were the king's witnesses, but they were executed. Ilona Jó and Dorottya Szentes had their fingers torn out with a pair of red-hot pincers and were then burned alive. Due to his youth and the belief that he was less culpable, János Újváry was executed by a much less painful method: beheading. Afterwards, his body was burned on the same pyre as Jó and Szentes. Another servant, Erzsi Majorova, initially escaped capture, but was burned alive after being apprehended. Katarína Benická received a life sentence after evidence showed that she'd been abused by the other women.

The accusations of murder were based on rumors. There is no document to prove that anyone in the area complained about the Countess. In this time period, if someone was harmed, or someone even stole a chicken, a letter of complaint was written. Two trials were held in the wake of Báthory's arrest: the first was held on 2 January 1611, and the second on 7 January 1611.

The highest number of victims cited during the trial of Báthory's accomplices was 650, but this number comes from the claim by a servant girl named Susannah that Jakab Szilvássy, Báthory's court official, had seen the figure in one of Báthory's private books. The book was never revealed and Szilvássy never mentioned it in his testimony.

Confinement and death

On 25 January 1611, Thurzó wrote a letter to King Matthias describing that they had captured and confined Báthory to her castle. The palatine also coordinated the steps of the investigation with the political struggle with the Prince of Transylvania. She was detained in the castle of Csejte for the remainder of her life, where she died at the age of 54. As György Thurzó wrote, Elizabeth Báthory was locked in a bricked room, but according to other sources (written documents from the visit of priests, July 1614), she was able to move freely and unhindered in the castle, more akin to house arrest.

She wrote a will in September 1610, in which she left all current and future inheritance possession to her children. In the last month of 1614, she signed her arrangement, in which she distributed the estates, lands and possessions among her children. On the evening of 20 August 1614, Báthory complained to her bodyguard that her hands were cold, whereupon he replied "It's nothing, mistress. Just go lie down." She went to sleep and was found dead the following morning. She was buried in the church of Csejte on 25 November 1614, but according to some sources due to the villagers' uproar over having the Countess buried in their cemetery, her body was moved to her birth home at Ecsed, where it was interred at the Báthory family crypt. The location of her body today is unknown but believed to be buried deep in the church area of the castle. The Csejte church and the castle of Csejte do not bear any markings of her possible grave.

Veracity of accusations
Several authors, such as László Nagy and Dr. Irma Szádeczky-Kardoss, have argued that Elizabeth Báthory was a victim of a conspiracy. Nagy argued that the proceedings against Báthory were largely politically motivated, possibly due to her extensive wealth and ownership of large areas of land in Hungary, which increased after the death of her husband. The theory is consistent with Hungarian history at that time, which included religious and political conflicts, especially relating to the wars with the Ottoman Empire, the spread of Protestantism and the extension of Habsburg power over Hungary. Moreover, Matthias owed a large debt to Báthory, which was cancelled after she was arrested.

There are counter-arguments made against this theory. The investigation into Báthory's crimes was sparked by complaints from a Lutheran minister, István Magyari. This does not contribute to the notion of a Catholic/Habsburg plot against the Protestant Báthory, although religious tension is still a possible source of conflict, as Báthory was raised Calvinist, not Lutheran. To support Báthory's innocence, the testimony of around 300 witnesses  and the physical evidence collected by the investigators have to be addressed or disputed. That evidence included numerous bodies and dead and dying girls found when the castle was entered by Thurzó. Szádeczky-Kardoss argues that the physical evidence was exaggerated and Thurzó misrepresented dead and wounded patients as victims of Báthory, as disgracing her would greatly benefit his political state ambitions.

Folklore and popular culture

The case of Elizabeth Báthory inspired numerous stories during the 18th and 19th centuries. The most common motif of these works was that of the countess bathing in her virgin victims' blood to retain beauty or youth. This legend appeared in print for the first time in 1729, in the Jesuit scholar László Turóczi's Tragica Historia, the first written account of the Báthory case. The story came into question in 1817 when the witness accounts (which had surfaced in 1765) were published for the first time. They included no references to blood baths. In his book Hungary and Transylvania, published in 1850, John Paget describes the supposed origins of Báthory's blood-bathing, although his tale seems to be a fictionalized recitation of oral history from the area. It is difficult to know how accurate his account of events is. Sadistic pleasure is considered a far more plausible motive for Báthory's crimes.

Báthory has been labelled by Guinness World Records as the most prolific female murderer, though the number of her victims is debated.

Ancestry

Báthory was the great-great-granddaughter of Barbara Aleksandrówna and Bolesław IV of Warsaw, and Mikalojus Radvila the Old; the 3rd great-granddaughter of Bolesław Januszowic; the 4th great-granddaughter of Vladimir Olgerdovich; and the 5th great-granddaughter of Algirdas.

See also

Countess Dracula – 1971 horror film directed by Peter Sasdy
Cruelty and the Beast – 1998 conceptual album by British gothic metal band Cradle of Filth
Immoral Tales – 1973 portmanteau film; the third story is 'Erzsébet Báthory'
Bathory – 2008 historical drama written and directed by Juraj Jakubisko
The Countess – 2009 drama historical film written and directed by Julie Delpy
Blood Countess – 2020 fictional novel written by Lana Popović
Bathory – Swedish metal band 1983–2004
 Elizabeth Branch
 Elizabeth Brownrigg
 Kateřina of Komárov
 Delphine LaLaurie
 Catalina de los Ríos y Lisperguer
 Darya Nikolayevna Saltykova
 Mariam Soulakiotis
 Ranavalona I
 List of serial killers by country

References

Further reading

 Raymond T. McNally (1931–2002) was a professor of Russian and East European History at Boston College

 Translation from the French Erzsébet Báthory la Comtesse sanglante

Zsuffa, Joseph (2015). Countess of the Moon. Griffin Press. .

External links

The Blood Countess? - Epitome of Dr. Szádeczky-Kardoss Irma's research
Elizabeth Bathory - the Blood Countess BBC piece on Erzsébet Báthory, Created 2 August 2001; Updated 28 January 2002
 Festival in Čachtice, Slovakia

A complete genealogy of all descendants Elizabeth Báthory (17th-20th century)
 (Documentary film)

 
1560 births
1614 deaths
16th-century criminals
16th-century Hungarian people
16th-century Hungarian women
16th-century landowners
17th-century criminals
17th-century Hungarian people
17th-century Hungarian women
17th-century landowners
Elizabeth
Hungarian female serial killers
Hungarian nobility
People from Nyírbátor
People with epilepsy
Torturers
Vampirism (crime)
Violence against women in Europe